Wallace Corporation v. National Labor Relations Board, 323 U.S. 248 (1944), is a US labor law case of the United States Supreme Court.

Facts
In an attempt to settle a labor dispute at a company plant, the company signed an agreement with two unions (a company union, which was referred to as "Independent" in the company and in the judgment, and a CIO union) that had been approved by the National Labor Relations Board.  Pursuant to this agreement, at a consent election was held to determine which union would be certified by the Board as bargaining representative; the company-dominated union won a majority of the votes cast. The company then signed a union shop contract with the union knowing that the union intended to refuse membership to employees who supported the CIO union.  The company union refused to admit C. I. O. men to membership and the company discharged them.

Judgment

National Labor Relations Board
In a subsequent unfair labor practice proceeding the Board found that the company had engaged in unfair labor practices in two respects:
(1) the company union had been set up, maintained, and used by the company to frustrate the threatened unionization of its plant by the C. I. O. (i.e. it was a "company union"); and
(2) the union shop contract was made by the company with knowledge that the company union intended to use the contract as a means of bringing about the discharge of former C. I. O. employees by denying them membership in the company union.

Accordingly, the NLRB entered an order requiring petitioner to disestablish the company union; to cease and desist from giving effect to the union shop contract between it and the company union; and to reinstate forty-three employees, whom it found to have been discharged, according to the terms of the union shop contract, because of their affiliation with the C. I. O. and their failure to belong to the company union.

Circuit Court
The Circuit Court of Appeals ordered enforcement of the NLRB's Order.

The Supreme Court granted certiorari "because of the importance to the administration of the Act of the questions involved." 322 U.S. 721.

Supreme Court
The Board's order was upheld by the United States Supreme Court even though it was not found that the company engaged in a conspiracy to bring about the employees' discharge. The Court emphasized the general hostility of the company to the rival union and members. The employer was not obliged to enter into the closed shop contract when it knew that discriminatory discharges of its employees were bound to occur under the contract.

See also
US labor law

References

External links

1944 in United States case law
United States Supreme Court cases
United States Supreme Court cases of the Stone Court
United States labor case law
National Labor Relations Board litigation
Nicholas County, West Virginia